Fortiforceps is an extinct genus of Cambrian megacheiran arthropod known from the Chengjiang biota of Yunnan, China. It was originally described by Hou and Bergström in 1997, and redescribed in 2020. The head has a large pair of stalked eyes, a pair of frontal projections, as well as a pair of great appendages, like other megacheirans, along with two other cephalic appendages. The trunk has either 20 or 22 segments, depending on the specimen. These segments have pronounced blade-like spines on their upper-outer edge. Each of the trunk segments (aside from the last, typically 20th segment) are associated with pairs of biramous limbs, which probably have seven podomeres and like other megacheirans, have paddle-shaped exopods. The trunk terminates with a forked tailpiece, which on their outer edges had rod-like structures. The two lobes were separated by a rectangular central piece. It has been placed as a member of the family Jiangfengiidae, alongside Jianfengia, Sklerolibyon and possibly Parapeytoia.

References 

Megacheira
Cambrian arthropods
Cambrian animals of Asia
Cambrian Series 2 first appearances
Maotianshan shales fossils
Fossil taxa described in 1997
Prehistoric arthropod genera